David John Leyburn Richardson  (born 14 March 1946) is an Australian Anglican priest, former cathedral dean and director of the Anglican Centre in Rome.

Early life and ministry 
David Richardson was born in Townsville, Queensland, but spent most of his childhood in England in North Devon and then the Midlands where his father worked as a priest. He finished his schooling in Brisbane.

After studying English literature at the University of Queensland, Richardson studied theology at St Barnabas College in Adelaide and then received his postgraduate diploma in pastoral theology at the University of Birmingham in the United Kingdom.

Richardson remained in the United Kingdom and served a curacy at the Church of St Mary the Great, Cambridge, the civic and university church of Cambridge, while also serving as chaplain at Girton College at the university from 1976 to 1979. He then returned to St Barnabas’ College as sub-warden where he taught New Testament studies, liturgy and pastoral care and spirituality until 1982. For the next five years he was the rector of Christ Church in St Lucia, Brisbane.

Cathedral dean
In 1988, Richardson was invited to become the dean of St Peter's Cathedral, Adelaide, where he served for 11 years before becoming the dean of St Paul's Cathedral, Melbourne, in 1999. As dean, he led a multimillion-dollar public appeal to restore the cathedral's spires and improve the interior of the building. His contribution is commemorated by the stone sculpture of his head by Melbourne artist Smiley Williams on one of the cathedral's spires.

On his departure from St Paul's in 2008, the cathedral chapter awarded him the title of Dean Emeritus. This honour recognises his ministry in two metropolitan cathedrals, his achievement in restoring the building of St Paul's Cathedral and his ministry which built up the attendances and finances in Melbourne.

Richardson was for 10 years the clerical representative for Australia on the Anglican Consultative Council (1992–2002). For 25 years he also served on the Australian National Liturgical Commission and was its executive secretary for 15 years. He also served for 15 years on an ecumenical body, the Australian Consultation on Liturgy.

Anglican Centre in Rome 
In December 2007, Richardson was appointed as the representative of the Archbishop of Canterbury, Rowan Williams, to the Holy See and the director of the Anglican Centre in Rome. He was installed in his new position by Archbishop Williams on 7 May 2008 at a ceremony in the Church of Santa Maria sopra Minerva.

Richardson retired in April 2013 and was succeeded by Archbishop David Moxon.

Honours and awards 
Richardson was installed as an honorary provincial canon of Canterbury Cathedral on 5 June 2010.

He was appointed an officer of the Order of the British Empire (OBE) in the 2013 Queen's Birthday Honours (UK) for services to strengthening relations between the UK, the Anglican Communion and the Holy See.

He was appointed an officer of the Order of Australia (AO) in the 2016 Australia Day Honours for distinguished service to religion and to the Anglican Church of Australia, through international representational, ecumenical development and interfaith co-operation roles.

Richardson is also a chaplain of the Most Venerable Order of the Hospital of Saint John of Jerusalem (Order of St John) (ChStJ).

Personal 
Richardson's interests include poetry, cooking, cars, cricket, and gardening.

References

External links 
 Anglican Centre in Rome website

1946 births
People from Townsville
Living people
Australian priests
Chaplains of Girton College, Cambridge
Chaplains of the Order of St John
Alumni of the University of Birmingham
University of Queensland alumni
Officers of the Order of Australia
Officers of the Order of the British Empire
Deans of Melbourne
Deans of Adelaide